Suman Nagarkar is a Kannada film actress, known for her work in BABRU, BRAHMI, Stalker, Nishkarsha, Nammura Mandara Hoove, Ammavara Ganda, Hoomale, Beladingala Baale, Ishtakamya, Jeerjimbe, Preetsu Tappenilla, Mungaaru Minchu, Doni Saagali and many others.

Suman is also an avid hiker and a marathon runner.

Suman is a trained singer and has performed for AIR. Her Hindustani vocal training was from Pt. Sheshadri Gawai under Gwalior gharana.

Early life 
Suman Nagarkar grew up in South Bangalore, studied at Mahila Seva Samaja, National High School and later at National College.

Film career
Suman Nagarkar was introduced to the Kannada film industry by T.S. Narasimhan - a playwright and a script writer, while he was working on the script for  Kalyana Mantapa. Suman acted in the role of Raghavendra Rajkumar's sister. She went on to act in other movies like  Taayiya Runa, Prema Setuve, Manava 2022 and Doni Sagali.

Suman played a negative role in Shiva Rajkumar's Ammavra Ganda which also brought Bollywood actor Bhagyashree to Kannada Film Industry. Suman gained popularity from movies like Nammoora Mandara Hoove and Beladingala Baale. She acted in the main role in the movie Beladingala Baale, where her face would not be shown to the audience. Suman also garnered a lot of attention for her performance in Ramesh Aravind's Mungarina Minchu. After appearing in several movies she played the role of a young widow as a lead actor in Hoomale directed by Nagathihalli Chandrashekhar. Her last movie before moving to USA was with Ravichandran (Kannada actor)'s Preethsu Thappenilla.

Suman won Lux Udaya Best Actress Award for her performance in Hoomale.

While in USA Suman taught Hindustani Vocal Music to young and adult students to help people get music orientation. She also attended San Francisco State University, Cosumnes River College and Folsom Lake College to learn various aspects of Film Making.

After a long gap of 15 years, she returned to acting in Ishtakamya, directed by Nagathihalli Chandrashekar, Jeerjimbe directed by Karthik Saragur and Re..., directed by Sunil Kumar Desai. Suman also acted in Kavitha Lankesh's Summer Holidays.

Suman started a production house to produce content oriented films and produced the first Hollywood Kannada film called Babru. This is the first Kannada film to be fully made in USA by Kannadigas living in the USA. This was coproduced by Suman Nagarkar Productions and USA based Yuga Creations. Her next production is Brahmi. She also acted in several films like Stalker, AB+, Mrityunjaya, Rangapravesha among many.

Prior to films, Suman acted in several television shows like Astangatha, Kannadiyolagina Kanasugalu directed by Prakash Belawadi, Sankalana, Belli Tere, Vaidehi directed by S. Mahendar, Pattedaar Prabhakar directed by T. N. Seetharam, Shakthi,Sanghatane and many more. Suman was also a popular model and was featured for Chennai's Kumaran silks, Rooja Pak, Akash Pumps and other products.

Suman was the anchor for Ms. World 1992 for the Kannada relay of the event.

Suman is also an avid hiker and a marathon runner, perhaps the only actor in Kannada Film Industry to have run over 50 Half Marathons and 25 Marathons.

Suman is also a trained Hindustani singer being trained by Pt. Sheshadri Gawai of Gwalior Gharana. Suman used to sing for AIR Bangalore in Yuva Vani.

Filmography
 Kalyana Mantapa
 Nishkarsha
 Ammavra Ganda
 Beladingala Baale (1995)
 Nammoora Mandara Hoove
 Hoomale
 Doni Saagali
 Mungarina Minchu
 Preethsu Thappenilla (2000)
 Ishtakamya (2015)
 ...Re (2016)
 Jeerjimbe (2017)
 Grey (Short Film) (2017)
 Babru (2019) 
 Brahmi (Upcoming film)
 Rangapravesha (Upcoming film)

References

External links
 

Actresses in Kannada cinema
Indian film actresses
Actresses from Karnataka
Living people
Year of birth missing (living people)
20th-century Indian actresses
21st-century Indian actresses